Nadja Hüpscher (born 23 March 1972) is a Dutch actress and writer.

Early life 
Hüpscher studied Cultural Management at the Amsterdam School of the Arts and also did amateur theatre at the time.

Career 

In 1999, she won the Golden Calf for Best Actress award for her role as Noor in Based on the Novel directed by Eddy Terstall. In 2001, she appeared in the film Costa! directed by Johan Nijenhuis and in 2004, she appeared in the film Simon directed by Eddy Terstall.

In 2007, she participated in the popular television show Wie is de Mol?. In 2020, she appeared in a special anniversary edition of the show, called Wie is de Mol? Renaissance, which featured only contestants of previous seasons. Nadja published her first book in 2014, IN THE WILD, CONVERSATIONS OF THE STREET, with Atlas Contact. She writes columns and articles for several magazines. She finished her studies at the Scriptacademy in 2018. Nadja Hüpscher has also been an ambassador for the Helen Dowling Institute since 2021.

Filmography

As actress

As contestant 

 2007: Wie is de Mol?
 2020: Wie is de Mol? Renaissance (anniversary season)

References

External links 
 

Living people
1972 births
People from Nijmegen
Dutch film actresses
Dutch women writers
Golden Calf winners
20th-century Dutch actresses
21st-century Dutch actresses